The Promotion of Equality and Prevention of Unfair Discrimination Act,  2000 (PEPUDA or the Equality Act, Act No. 4 of 2000) is a comprehensive South African anti-discrimination law. It prohibits unfair discrimination by the government and by private organisations and individuals and forbids hate speech and harassment. The act specifically lists race, gender, sex, pregnancy, family responsibility or status, marital status, ethnic or social origin, HIV/AIDS status, colour, sexual orientation, age, disability, religion, conscience, belief, culture, language and birth as "prohibited grounds" for discrimination, but also contains criteria that courts may apply to determine which other characteristics are prohibited grounds. Employment discrimination is excluded from the ambit of the act because it is addressed by the Employment Equity Act, 1998. The act establishes the divisions of the High Court and designated Magistrates' Courts as "Equality Courts" to hear complaints of discrimination, hate speech and harassment.

Background
Section Nine of the Constitution of South Africa contains a guarantee of equality and a prohibition of public and private discrimination. It obliges the national government to enact legislation to prohibit discrimination, and a transitional clause required this legislation to be enacted by 4 February 2000, three years after the constitution came into force. The Equality Act was assented to by the President on 2 February 2000; it was enacted alongside two other laws similarly required by the constitution: the Promotion of Access to Information Act (PAIA), dealing with freedom of information, and the Promotion of Administrative Justice Act (PAJA), dealing with justice in administrative law.

References

External links 
 Department of Justice and Constitutional Development: Equality Courts
 Promotion of Equality and Prevention of Unfair Discrimination Act, 2000, as amended
 Regulations Relating to the Promotion of Equality and Prevention of Unfair Discrimination, 2003 
 South African Human Rights Commission

Anti-discrimination law in South Africa
South African legislation
2000 in South African law
LGBT law in South Africa
2000 in LGBT history